Vume is a small town in the South Tongu District of the Volta Region near Sogakope. The residents of Vume are well noted for the art of pottery.

References

Populated places in the Volta Region